Yarom Qayah (also Romanized as Yārom Qayah and Yārom Qayeh; also known as Yāramgiya) is a village in Pish Khowr Rural District, Pish Khowr District, Famenin County, Hamadan Province, Iran. At the 2006 census, its population was 33, in 10 families.

References 

Populated places in Famenin County